Bulaga may refer to:
 Eat Bulaga!, Philippine television variety show
 List of Eat Bulaga! segments
 Eat Bulaga! Indonesia
 The New Eat Bulaga! Indonesia
 Bryan Bulaga (born 1989), American football offensive tackle of Polish descent